Jamie Sparrow (born 22 January 1971) is an English cricketer.  Sparrow is a right-handed batsman who bowls right-arm fast-medium.  He was born at Bishop's Stortford, Hertfordshire.

In 1997, Sparrow played a single Minor Counties Championship match for Cambridgeshire against Bedfordshire.  He later represented the Essex Cricket Board in a single List A match against Ireland in the 1999 NatWest Trophy.  In his only List A match he took 2 wickets at a bowling average of 21.00, with figures of 2/42.

References

External links
 
 Jamie Sparrow at CricketArchive

1971 births
Living people
Cambridgeshire cricketers
Cricketers from Bishop's Stortford
English cricketers
Essex Cricket Board cricketers